Nikola Ćirković (born 4 December 1991) is a Serbian footballer.

International career
Ćirković made his international debut for the Serbia B team in a friendly 3-0 loss to Qatar.

References

External links
 
 Nikola Ćirković stats at utakmica.rs

1991 births
Living people
People from Priboj
Serbian footballers
Serbia international footballers
FK Metalac Gornji Milanovac players
FC Minsk players
FK Voždovac players
FK Čukarički players
Bnei Sakhnin F.C. players
F.C. Kafr Qasim players
FK Mladost Lučani players
Serbian SuperLiga players
Serbian First League players
Belarusian Premier League players
Israeli Premier League players
Liga Leumit players
Serbian expatriate footballers
Expatriate footballers in Belarus
Expatriate footballers in Israel
Serbian expatriate sportspeople in Belarus
Serbian expatriate sportspeople in Israel
Association football utility players
Association football defenders